The early Holocene sea level rise (EHSLR) was a significant jump in sea level
by about   during the early Holocene, between about 12,000 and 7,000 years ago, spanning the Eurasian Mesolithic. The rapid rise in sea level and associated climate change, notably the 8.2 ka cooling event (8,200 years ago),
and the loss of coastal land favoured by early farmers, may have contributed to the spread of the Neolithic Revolution to Europe in its Neolithic period.

During deglaciation since the Last Glacial Maximum, between about 20,000 to 7,000 years ago (20–7 ka), the sea level rose 
During the rest of the early Holocene, the rate of sea level rise varied from a low of about /yr to as high as /yr during brief periods of accelerated sea level rise.

Solid geological evidence, based largely upon analysis of deep cores of coral reefs, exists only for three major periods of accelerated sea level rise, called meltwater pulses, during the last deglaciation. The first, Meltwater pulse 1A, lasted between c. 14.6–14.3 ka and was a  rise over about 290 years centered at 14.2 ka.

The EHSLR spans Meltwater pulses 1B and 1C, between 12,000 and 7,000 years ago:
Meltwater pulse 1B between c. 11.4–11.1 ka, a  rise over about 160 years centered at 11.1 ka,  which includes the end of Younger Dryas interval  of reduced sea level rise at about /yr;
Such rapid rates of sea level rising during meltwater events clearly implicate major ice-loss events related to ice sheet collapse. The primary source may have been meltwater from the Antarctic ice sheet. Other studies suggest a Northern Hemisphere source for the meltwater in the Laurentide Ice Sheet.

The EHSLR left some traces in the mythology and oral history of Australian Aborigines.

See also

References

Torbjörn E. Törnqvist,  Marc P. Hijma, "Links between early Holocene ice-sheet decay, sea-level rise and abrupt climate change", Nature Geoscience vol. 5 (2012), 601–606.
T. M. Cronin  P. R. Vogt  D. A. Willard  R. Thunell  J. Halka  M. Berke  J. Pohlman, "Rapid sea level rise and ice sheet response to 8,200‐year climate event", Geophysical Research Letters vol. 34, issue 20 (October 2007), .
Kazuaki Hori  Yoshiki Saito, "An early Holocene sea‐level jump and delta initiation", Geophysical Research Letters vol. 34, issue 18 (September 2007),  .
Shi-Yong Yu, Y.-X. Li and T.E. Törnqvist, "Tempo of global deglaciation during the early Holocene: A sea level perspective",  PAGES News vol. 17, no. 2 (June 2009), .

Sea level
Holocene
Last Glacial Period
Mesolithic
Neolithic